Frederick Thompson (c. 1873 − 13 January 1958) was an English footballer who played as a goalkeeper in the Football League around the turn of the 20th century. Playing for Bury, he was an FA Cup winner in 1900.

Playing career
Born in South Hetton in the north east of England, Thompson first played for Sunderland in the 1895−96 season.

He went to Bury, playing with them when they won the FA Cup final at Crystal Palace in 1900.

He later played for several other clubs including: Bolton Wanderers, Luton Town, Portsmouth, Fulham, Norwich City, Doncaster Rovers, Denaby United and Brodsworth Main.

References

1870s births
1958 deaths
People from South Hetton
Footballers from County Durham
English footballers
Association football goalkeepers
Sunderland West End F.C. players
Sunderland A.F.C. players
Bury F.C. players
Bolton Wanderers F.C. players
Luton Town F.C. players
Portsmouth F.C. players
Fulham F.C. players
Norwich City F.C. players
Doncaster Rovers F.C. players
Denaby United F.C. players
Brodsworth Welfare A.F.C. players
English Football League players
Midland Football League players
FA Cup Final players